David Mercado Valderrama (born February 1, 1933) is a Filipino-American politician from Maryland. He served as a Democratic member of the Maryland House of Delegates from 1991 to 2003 and was the first Filipino-American elected to a state legislature on the mainland United States, as well as the first Asian American and first Filipino American elected to the Maryland General Assembly.

Early life and education
Valderrama was born in Manila on February 1, 1933. At 16 years old, he went into business for himself, selling everything from cars to cigarettes. He aspired to be a violinist, organizing an orchestra while in high school. He also helped edit the school paper and won national essay contests. He attended Far Eastern University, where he earned a Bachelor of Laws degree in 1956, and George Washington University, where he earned a Master of Comparative Law degree in 1988.

Career
Valderrama became involved with politics while attending college. He spoke out against the regime of Philippine President Ferdinand Marcos after his declaration of martial law in the Philippines in 1972, later criticizing him during his meeting with U.S. President Ronald Reagan in 1982. In December 1984, Valderrama was arrested during an anti-apartheid demonstration outside of the South African embassy in Washington, D.C., and in the following year he formed the Asian Americans Against Apartheid group to encourage community protests against the regime in South Africa and for the release of Nelson Mandela.

In 1982, Valderrama ran for the Maryland House of Delegates in District 25. Although his bid was unsuccessful, political observers were surprised with the force in which Philippine American voters turned out to support Valderrama. In 1986, Maryland governor Harry Hughes appointed Valderrama to serve on the Orphans' Court.

In September 2016, Valderrama attended an anti-Marcos protest in Washington, D.C. to protest against Philippine President Rodrigo Duterte's decision to allow Marcos' burial at the Libingan ng mga Bayani cemetery.

In the legislature
Valderrama was sworn into the Maryland House of Delegates on January 9, 1991. From 1995 to 2001, he served the Deputy Majority Whip, and as the Deputy Majority Leader of the House of Delegates from 2001 to 2003. During his service, he unsuccessfully pushed for the legalization of medical marijuana.

Committee assignments
 Member, Constitutional and Administrative Law Committee, 1991–92
 Member, Environmental Matters Committee, 1992–94
 Member, Judiciary Committee, 1995–2003 (gambling subcommittee, 1995–97; chair, gaming law & enforcement subcommittee, 1999–2003)
 Member, Joint Committee on Protocol, 1995–2003

Other memberships
 Member, Law Enforcement and State-Appointed Boards Committee, Prince George's County Delegation (chair, 1995–98)

Electoral history

References

Asian-American people in Maryland politics
American politicians of Filipino descent
American people of Filipino descent
Filipino emigrants to the United States
Democratic Party members of the Maryland House of Delegates
21st-century American politicians
Living people
1933 births